Xihe is the atonal pinyin romanization of the Mandarin pronunciation of various Chinese names.

It may refer to:

People
Xihe (deity), a Chinese solar deity

Science 
 Xihe, or Chinese H-alpha Solar Explorer, a solar observatory

Places
Xihe Commandery (西河郡), a former commandery of imperial China around Fenyang, Shanxi
Xihe District (细河区), a district in Fuxin, Liaoning, China
Xihe County (西和县), a county in Gansu, China
HD 173416 (star), Constellation Lyra; a G8-type giant star; named after the Chinese solar deity

Towns
Xihe, Chongqing (西河), in Tongliang County, Chongqing, China
Xihe, Yongjing County (西河), in Yongjing County, Gansu, China
Xihe, Dabu County (西河), in Dabu County, Guangdong, China
Xihe, Shaoguan (西河), in Wujiang District, Shaoguan, Guangdong, China
Xihe, Guangxi (西河), in Mengshan County, Guangxi, China
Xihe, Heilongjiang (西河), in Keshan County, Heilongjiang, China
Xihe, Suizhou, in Zengdu District, Suizhou, Hubei, China
Xihe, Xiaogan, in Xiaonan District, Xiaogan, Hubei, China
Xihe, Hunan (西河), in Xinhua County, Hunan, China
Xihe, Jiangsu (溪河), in Huai'an District, Huai'an, Jiangsu, China
Xihe, Jilin (溪河), in Shulan, Jilin, China
Xihe, Shaanxi (西河), in Pingli County, Shaanxi, China
Xihe, Shandong (西河), in Zichuan District, Zibo, Shandong, China
Xihe, Chengdu (西河), in Longquanyi District, Chengdu, Sichuan, China

Townships
Xihe Township, Guizhou (西河乡), in Meitan County, Guizhou, China
Xihe Township, Fenyang (西河乡), in Fenyang, Shanxi, China
Xihe Township, Yangcheng County (西河乡), in Yangcheng County, Shanxi, China
Xihe Township, Nanbu County (西河乡), in Nanbu County, Sichuan, China
Xihe Township, Xide County (西河乡), in Xide County, Sichuan, China

See also

 
 
 
 Xi (disambiguation)
 He (disambiguation)
 Hexi (disambiguation)